"You Oughta Be in Pictures" is a 1934 song composed by the American songwriting team Dana Suesse and Edward Heyman.  It was recorded two weeks later by Rudy Vallée for RCA Records and rapidly became the unofficial anthem of the American film industry. The song has been covered by numerous other singers, and is often used on the soundtrack of later productions set during the 1930s.

Original sheet music shows the title, "You Oughta Be in Pictures (My Star of Stars)" using the colloquial, "oughta" rather than the standard "ought to."  The cover of the sheet music also notes, "Introduced in the William Rowland production "New York Town" released by Columbia Pictures, Inc."

The singer compliments the female object of the song in multiple ways, eventually making a comparison to movie stars who had been popular at the time, including "Crawford" (Joan Crawford), "Davies" (Marion Davies), "Gaynor" (Janet Gaynor), "West" (Mae West), "Garbo" (Greta Garbo), and "Tashman" (Lilyan Tashman).

"You Ought To Be in Pictures [sic]," a 1940 animated film, opens with the song, "You Oughta Be in Pictures."

Other versions
Boswell Sisters - recorded March 23, 1934 for Brunswick Records (catalog 6798).
Al Bowlly(1934) (Al Bowlly Discography)
Little Jack Little - recorded February 8, 1934 for Columbia Records (catalog No. 2895D).
Connie Francis - for her album Connie & Clyde – Hit Songs of the 30s (1968)
Doris Day

Popular References 
"You Oughta Be in Pictures" was used in the film, "Inside Daisy Clover."

The cover of "You Oughta Be in Pictures" by The Boswell Sisters was featured in Halloween Horror Nights 13.

References

Bibliography
 Dana Suesse & Peter Mintun. Jazz Nocturne and Other Piano Music with Selected Songs. Courier Corporation, 2012.

American songs
1934 songs
Songs with lyrics by Edward Heyman
RCA Records singles